St John the Baptist with Four Saints or St John the Baptist Among Other Saints is a 1515 oil on canvas painting by Andrea Previtali, displayed in the first side-chapel on the north side of the nave of the church of Santo Spirito in Bergamo, the artist's birthplace. It was the artist's first public commission after his return to Bergamo from Venice.

The work shows (left to right) Nicholas of Bari (referring to the commissioners' generosity), saint Bartholomew (in reference to Bartolomeo Casotti de Mazzoleni, one of the work's commissioners along with his brother Giacomo), John the Baptist (patron of the Lateran Canons who had recently taken over the running of Santo Spirito), Blessed Giacomo da Bergamo (to whom the Lateran Canons had a particular devotion) and Saint Joseph (a patron saint of the city).

References

Bibliography
 
 
 

1515 paintings
Paintings in Bergamo
Paintings by Andrea Previtali
Paintings of Saint Nicholas
Paintings depicting John the Baptist
Paintings of Saint Joseph
Paintings of Bartholomew the Apostle